"" is a song performed by Norwegian DJ Kygo, featuring Norwegian rappers Store P and Lars Vaular. The song was released as a digital download on 14 June 2019 by Sony Music. The song peaked at number three on the Norwegian Singles Chart. The song was written by Kyrre Gørvell-Dahll, Lars Nesheim Vaular, Mikkel Storleer Eriksen, Petter Skarre Sundby and Tor Erik Hermansen.

Charts

References

2019 singles
2019 songs
Kygo songs
Norwegian-language songs
Song recordings produced by Kygo
Songs written by Kygo
Songs written by Mikkel Storleer Eriksen
Songs written by Tor Erik Hermansen
Ultra Music singles